Keven J. Stratton is an American politician and a Republican member of the Utah House of Representatives representing District 48 since January 1, 2013. Stratton served consecutively from his April 28, 2012 appointment to fill the vacancy caused by the resignation of Stephen Sandstrom until January 1, 2013 in the District 58 seat. He lives in Orem.

Early life and education
Stratton earned his BS in finance from Brigham Young University and his JD from its J. Reuben Clark Law School. He has eight children, a scoutmaster, and has owned and operated small businesses in Utah County. He is a real estate, business and estate-planning attorney. He is also a land developer and owner and operator of the Cascade Golf Course.

Political career
Stratton was appointed on January 1, 2013. During the 2016 Legislative Session, he served on the Executive Offices and Criminal Justice Appropriations Subcommittee, the House Judiciary Committee and the House Public Utilities, Energy, and Technology Committee.

He has also taken a stand in favor of morality laws such as outlawing sex outside of marriage. He was one of 32 Utah Republicans who voted to keep extra-marital sex illegal in Utah.

2016 sponsored legislation

Stratton also floor-sponsored SB0234 Protecting Unborn Children Amendments and SB0237S01 Immigration and Alien Related Amendments.

Elections
 2014 Stratton won against Timothy Spencer in the June 24, 2014 primary election and was unopposed for the general election on November 4, 2014 due to Janita Anderson (D) withdrawing before the primary.
 2012 Redistricted to District 48, and with incumbent Republican Representative LaVar Christensen redistricted to District 32, Stratton was chosen from among five candidates for the June 26, 2012, Republican primary which he won with 3,020 votes (54.7%); and was unopposed for the November 6, 2012, general election, winning with 13,237 votes.

References

External links
Official page at the Utah State Legislature
Campaign site
Keven Stratton at Ballotpedia
Keven J. Stratton at the National Institute on Money in State Politics
All links to bills in 2014 from rep. Stratton

Place of birth missing (living people)
Year of birth missing (living people)
Living people
Brigham Young University alumni
J. Reuben Clark Law School alumni
Republican Party members of the Utah House of Representatives
Politicians from Orem, Utah
Utah lawyers
21st-century American politicians